Marcel Dinu (born 24 July 1935) was a Romanian diplomat. He was the Romanian Ambassador to Moldova (1997-1999).

See also 
 Embassy of Romania in Chişinău
 Moldovan–Romanian relations

References

External links  
 CURRICULUM VITAE 
 Marcel Dinu. Ambassador of Romania to Egypt

1935 births
Living people
People from Silistra
Eastern Orthodox Christians from Romania
Ambassadors of Romania to Moldova
University of Bucharest alumni